Hadamar III of Laber (c. 1300 – 1360) was one of the Lords of Laber (now Laaber) in the Upper Palatinate, and an important courtly poet (Minnesänger).

Background
He is famous mainly for his allegorical poem "Die Jagd" (the hunt), written in Middle High German.

References

 

14th-century German nobility
Minnesingers
14th-century German poets
People from Regensburg (district)